Shreveport–Bossier is and has been home to a wide variety of sporting events.

American football

Bossier-Shreveport Battle Wings – (2001–2009) – AF2, (2010) – AFL
Shreveport Aftershock – (2007–2009) – IWFL
Shreveport-Bossier Bombers (2000) – IPFL
Shreveport Knights (1999) – RFL
Shreveport Pirates (1994–95) – CFL
Shreveport Shockhers (2006) – NWFA
Shreveport Steamer (1974–1975) – WFL
Shreveport Steamers (1979–1981) – AFA

Baseball

Arlington/Blue Stockings Base Ball Club (Shreveport) (1872)
Shreveport Acme Giants (1923) – Texas Colored League
Shreveport Black Sports (1926) – Texas Colored League (1927–28), (1929–30) – Texas–Oklahoma–Louisiana League, (1931) – Texas–Louisiana League (Negro league) (1946) – East Texas Negro League 
Shreveport Braves (1968–1970) – Texas League
Shreveport Captains (1971) – Dixie Association (1972–2000) – Texas League
Shreveport Gassers (1915–1924) – Texas League 
Shreveport Giants (1901–1903) – Southern Association
Shreveport Grays (1895) – Texas-Southern League 
Shreveport Pirates (1904–1910) – Southern Association (1908–1910) – Texas League
Shreveport Sports (1925–32, 1938–42, 1946–57) – Texas League (1933) – Dixie League (1934) – East Dixie League (1935) – West Dixie League (1959–1961) – Southern Association, (2003–2005) – Central League, (2006–2008) – American Association
Shreveport Swamp Dragons (2001–2002) – Texas League
Shreveport Tigers (1899) – Southern League, (1949) – Negro Texas League 
Shreveport Travelers (1951) – Arkansas–Louisiana–Texas League
Shreveport-Bossier Captains (2009–2011) – American Association

Basketball

Shreveport Crawdads (1994) – Continental Basketball Association
Shreveport Storm (1995) – Continental Basketball Association
Shreveport-Bossier Mavericks (2013–2015) – American Basketball Association/ 
Shreveport Mavericks         (2021-present)- The Basketball League

College
Bossier Parish Community College Cavaliers – NJCAA, MISS-LOU Junior College Conference
Centenary Gentlemen and Ladies – NCAA Division III, Southern Collegiate Athletic Conference
LSU–Shreveport Pilots – NAIA, Red River Athletic Conference
Southern University at Shreveport Jaguars – NJCAA, MISS-LOU Junior College Conference

Events
Independence Bowl (1976–present)
Red River State Fair Classic (1911–2016)

Ice hockey
Bossier-Shreveport Mudbugs (1997–2001) – WPHL, (2002–2011) CHL
Shreveport Mudbugs (2016–present) – North American Hockey League

Museums

The Museum of American Fencing

Roller derby
Twin City Knockers (2010–present)

Rugby
Shreveport Rugby Football Club (1977–present) (A.C. Steer Park) – Texas Geographical Union Division 2

Soccer
Shreveport/Bossier Lions (1998) – USISL D-3 Pro League
Boca Knights FC (2015–2019) – Gulf Coast Premier League
CABOSA Shreveport United S.C. (2018–present) – Gulf Coast Premier League
Shreveport Rafters FC (2016–2018) – National Premier Soccer League
Shreveport Rafters FC B (2016–2017) – Gulf Coast Premier League
Shreveport Lady Rafters (2017) – Women's Premier Soccer League

See also
List of sports teams in Louisiana

References

Sports in Shreveport, Louisiana
Bossier City, Louisiana